or  (or unofficially: Indre Sildvikvatnet) is a lake in Narvik Municipality in Nordland county, Norway.  The  lake lies south of the Rombaken fjord.  The lake has a dam on the northern end and the water is used for hydroelectric power production.

See also
List of lakes in Norway

References

Narvik
Lakes of Nordland
Reservoirs in Norway